Tillman was an English bulldog who held the Guinness World Record for "Fastest 100 m on a skateboard by a dog." He has appeared upon Greatest American Dog and is nicknamed Pot Roast. Tillman rode on the Natural Balance Rose Parade float since 2009. He is one of the stars of Who Let the Dogs Out presented by Petco on the Hallmark Channel. He died on October 27, 2015.

References

External links
Tillman Skates on Facebook
Tillman Skates on patiilan
Tillman Skates on Blogspot
Tillman Skates on patinolsun
Famous Skateboarding Dog Tillman Dies

Individual dogs
2015 animal deaths
Skateboarding